Pradip Kumar Brahma is a Bodoland People's Front politician from Assam. He was elected to the Assam Legislative Assembly in the 2016 election, from the Kokrajhar West constituency.

References 

Living people
Bodoland People's Front politicians
People from Kokrajhar district
Assam MLAs 2011–2016
Year of birth missing (living people)